The Norwegian Electricity Industry Association is an employers' organisation in Norway, organized under the national Confederation of Norwegian Enterprise.

The current CEO is Steinar Bysveen. Chairman of the board is Ola Mørkved Rinnan.

References

External links

Official site

Electric power in Norway
Employers' organisations in Norway
2001 establishments in Norway